K. Stuart "Stu" Shea (born January 9, 1957) is an American business executive and leader and intelligence professional serving in a leadership capacity to public and private companies, as well as an advisor to government agencies, private equity investors, and academic institutions. Shea is chairman, president and chief executive officer of Peraton, a national security technology company. He is the former president and chief operating officer of Leidos, chief operating officer of Science Applications International Corporation (SAIC), and founder and emeritus chairman of the United States Geospatial Intelligence Foundation.

Early life and education
Shea was born in New York, the son of Katherine Rea (née Hahn) and Kenneth Francis Shea. He attended Mineola High School, and excelled in both academics and sports, graduating in the top 25 of his class and earning seven varsity letters in football (center/defensive guard), lacrosse (goalie), and rifle. He was the captain of the rifle team and was one of the top high school marksmen in the country.

Shea received a Bachelor of Science degree in geological sciences from the State University of New York at Albany in 1979, and his Master of Arts degree in geography from the University of Kansas in 1983. He has also attended several executive development programs, including University of Virginia Darden School of Business, Harvard Business School, Wharton School of the University of Pennsylvania, and George Washington University School of Business.

Career
Shea started his career in national security in 1982 at Rome Research Corporation as a software engineer, designing some of the earliest implementations of computer mapping for the Central Intelligence Agency, National Security Agency, US Air Force, Defense Mapping Agency and others. From 1982 to 1987, Shea served as senior staff member and technical director, digital cartography for PAR Government Systems Corporation, leading advanced computer mapping research in cartographic generalization, automated character recognition, and cartographic applications for tactical and strategic systems. He joined The Analytic Sciences Corporation (TASC, Inc.) in 1987, serving as member of the technical staff, section manager, department manager and program manager until the acquisition of TASC by Primark Corporation in 1991. From 1991 to 1998, he served as the director, imagery and geospatial systems. When Litton Industries acquired TASC, he then served as senior vice president and strategic business unit director, information management. With the acquisition of Litton by Northrop Grumman in 2001, Shea served as vice president as the general manager, Space and Intelligence Business Unit.[4]

In 2005, Shea joined Science Applications International Corporation (SAIC) (NYSE: SAI), and led the National Security Space Business Unit and the Space & Geospatial Intelligence Business Unit. In 2007, he was named as the president of the Intelligence, Security and Technology Group, renamed in 2010 to the Intelligence, Surveillance and Reconnaissance Group. Shea led SAIC's support to the National Security Community. With nearly 13,000 employees and over $4B in revenues, his group provided technology services and products for customers across the full spectrum of national security programs, including: cyber-security; human intelligence (HUMINT), intelligence, surveillance and reconnaissance (ISR); signals intelligence (SIGINT); geospatial intelligence (GEOINT); support to special operations forces (SOF); intelligence analysis; linguistics; offense and defensive counter-space; and the development of technologies to support the fight against global terrorism.

In 2012, Shea was named chief operating officer of SAIC, an $11B FORTUNE 500® scientific, engineering, and technology company. Shea was the principal architect and has been credited with leading the corporate split of Science Applications International Corporation into Leidos (NYSE: LDOS) and the new SAIC (NYSE: SAIC) as two publicly traded companies when he served as the chief operating officer of SAIC. During that time, Shea led a team of 40,000 employees across 400 locations worldwide.

After the separation, Shea assumed the role of president and chief operating officer of Leidos, a $6B scientific, engineering, and technology company in national security, cybersecurity, engineering, and health. In the fall of 2012, Shea was considered a favorite to succeed Leidos chief executive officer John P. Jumper. In the spring of 2014, he resigned as COO.

After Leidos, Shea served in an advisory capacity to public and private companies, government agencies, private equity investors, and academic institutions as chief executive officer of Shea Strategies, LLC. In June 2017, Veritas Capital appointed Shea the CEO of MHVC Acquisition Corp, formerly Harris Corp.’s Government Services business. In August 2017, MHVC was rebranded by Shea as Peraton.

In 2021 he oversaw three acquisitions (mission support and IT solutions business of Northrop Grumman, Perspecta and as-a-service business of ViON) making of a US$1 billion a US$7 billion company all the while office footprint was reduced.

Honors and awards
 In 2021, Shea was named a recipient of the Executive Mosaic Wash100 Award for those distinguished GovCon executives that have demonstrated excellence in leadership, innovation, reliability, achievement and vision. 3 February 2021.
 In 2020, Shea was named a recipient of the Executive Mosaic Wash100 Award for those distinguished GovCon executives that have demonstrated excellence in leadership, innovation, reliability, achievement and vision. 22 January 2020.
 In 2019, Shea was named a recipient of the Executive Mosaic Wash100 Award for the most influential and impactful executives of consequence at the intersection of government and industry. 16 January 2019.
 In 2018, Shea was recognized by the Northern Virginia Technology Council (NVTC) as a Tech100 winner , for driving tech innovation, implementing new solutions for their customers, and leading growth in the Greater Washington Region. 3 December 2018.
 In 2018, Shea was recognized by Robert Cardillo, Director, National Geospatial-Intelligence Agency, National Geospatial-Intelligence Agency (NGA), with the GEOINT Hall of Fame, for a legacy of service to the GEOINT Community. 13 September 2018.
 In 2018, Shea was named a recipient of the Executive Mosaic Wash100 Award for the most influential and impactful executives of consequence at the intersection of government and industry.
 In 2017, Shea was recognized by the Honorable Jeffrey K. Harris, Chairman, United States Geospatial Intelligence Foundation (USGIF), with the "K. Stuart Shea Endowed Academic Scholarship", for a legacy of service to the GEOINT Community. 5 June 2017.
 In 2016, Shea was recognized by Director of National Intelligence, the Honorable Lt Gen James R. Clapper, Jr., USAF (Ret.) with the Intelligence Community Seal Medallion, for service on the Director of National Intelligence Senior Advisory Group (SAG).
 In 2014, Shea was recognized by the Washington Business Journal in association with the National Association of Corporate Directors, with the Outstanding Director award. This award honors high performing outside directors whose service to their boards has been exceptional.
 In 2013, Shea was named a recipient of the Executive Mosaic Wash100 Award for premier group of leaders who drive innovation and growth at the intersection of the public and private sectors.
 In 2009, Shea was awarded the Fed100 Award, Federal Computer Week award for the top executives in the IT industry.
 In 2003, he was named as one of the 12 members of the National Commission for the Review of the Research and Development Programs of the United States Intelligence Community. He was appointed by the Speaker of the House, the Honorable J. Dennis Hastert (R-IL), in consultation with the Chairman of the United States House Permanent Select Committee on Intelligence, the Honorable Porter Goss (R-FL).
 In 1997, Shea was named a Fellow, American Congress on Surveying and Mapping.

Professional services
Shea is the founder and emeritus chairman of United States Geospatial Intelligence Foundation (USGIF) (www.usgif.org) and the highly acclaimed GEOINT Symposium, and also served as president, CEO, and chairman of the board. USGIF is a 501(c)(3) educational foundation whose purpose is to promote the geospatial intelligence tradecraft and to develop a stronger community of interest between government, industry, academia, professional organizations and individuals who share a mission focused around the development and application of geospatial intelligence to address national security objectives. The GEOINT Symposium has become the largest single gathering of intelligence professionals in the world.

Shea is an internationally recognized author and has served on several major international refereed journal editorial boards. He has been an invited participant and speaker at a wide range of industry, government, and academic venues. Some of his significant professional appearances include:
 2018 Panelist, Pillsbury's 18th Annual Aerospace, Defense and Government Services M&A Conference, "Industry C-Suite Panel," Pillsbury Winthrop Shaw Pittman LLP, Tyson's Corner, VA.
 2017 Panelist, Morrison & Foerster Annual Federal M&A Outlook, "CEO Panel," Morrison & Foerster, Tyson's Corner, VA.
 2015 Invited speaker, GEOINT Symposium, “Perspectives on Public and Private Equity Investments in Intelligence,” United States Geospatial Intelligence Foundation (USGIF), Washington DC.
 2014 Invited speaker, Raymond James Government Services & Technology Summit, “Leidos,” Mandarin Oriental Hotel, Washington DC.
 2013 Invited speaker and panelist, Working Mother Media, 4th Annual Women in National Security Careers, “Getting Women to the Top—Ongoing, Multi-faceted Approaches to Develop & Retain Women Leaders in National Security,” Falls Church, VA.
 2013: Keynote Speaker: Stu Shea, The Citadel, Greater Issues Series, “Navigating National Security Challenges: A Call for Leadership,” Oct 10, Charleston, SC.
 2013 Invited panelist, Cowen & Company 34th Annual Aerospace and Defense Conference, “Cyber Threat Trends…How Big of An Issue?” The InterContinental New York Barclay, New York.
 2013 Invited speaker, Raymond James Government Services & Technology Summit, “SAIC,” Mandarin Oriental Hotel, Washington DC.
 2013: Inaugural Commencement Address, James Madison University (JMU), College of Integrated Science and Engineering.
 2013: Project Gemini, The Separation of SAIC, Bain Consulting.
 2013*: Opening Speaker: Stu Shea, GEOINT 2013* Symposium, United States Geospatial Intelligence Foundation (USGIF)
 2012: Opening Speaker: Stu Shea, GEOINT 2012 Symposium, United States Geospatial Intelligence Foundation (USGIF)
 2012 Invited panelist, Working Mother Media, 3rd Annual Women in National Security Careers, “The Faces of Courage in Women’s Leadership,” Falls Church, VA.
 2012 Invited speaker, Women in Technology International, Mentor-Protégé Program, “Leadership Journey.”
 2012 Invited speaker, National Geospatial-Intelligence Agency, Acquisition, Contracts Leadership Journey, “Translating a Leadership Philosophy into Execution.”
 2011: Opening Speaker: Stu Shea, GEOINT 2011 Symposium, United States Geospatial Intelligence Foundation (USGIF)
 2011 Invited speaker, National Geospatial-Intelligence Agency, Acquisition, Contracts Leadership Journey, “Translating a Leadership Philosophy into Execution.”
 2010: Opening Speaker: Stu Shea, GEOINT 2010 Symposium, United States Geospatial Intelligence Foundation (USGIF)
 2010 Invited speaker, National Geospatial-Intelligence Agency, Acquisition, Contracts Leadership Journey, “Translating a Leadership Philosophy into Execution.”
 2009 Invited speaker, Women in Technology International, Mentor-Protégé Program, “Connect, Lead, Succeed.”
 2008 Invited speaker, National Geospatial-Intelligence Agency, Acquisition Leadership Journey, “Leadership Perspectives: Achieving Effective Industry and Government Interactions.”
 2007 Invited speaker, Central Intelligence Agency, “Rules of the Road: Leadership Perspectives from Industry.”
 2006 Invited speaker, National Geospatial-Intelligence Agency, Acquisition Leadership Journey, “Leadership in a Changing World: An Industry Perspective.”
 2001 Invited panelist, National Reconnaissance Office (NRO) Joint Intelligence Acquisition Innovation Conference, “Acquisition Innovation,” Chantilly, VA
 1998 Invited speaker and panelist, University Consortium for Geographic Information Science (UCGIS), “GIS Research Priorities from University, Private Sector, and Governmental Viewpoints,” Park City, UT.
 1996 Invited speaker, AFCEA, “Geographic Security (GEOSEC): Attack and Protection in an Information Warfare (IW) Environment,” Fort Meade, MD.
 1996 Invited participant, National Academy of Sciences, National Research Council, Mapping Science Committee, “Future of Spatial Data and Society”
 1994 Invited speaker and panelist, Defense Mapping Agency (DMA) Industry Days, “Global Geospatial Information and Services User Needs,” Reston, VA.
 1990 Invited participant, National Center for Geographic Information and Analysis (NCGIA), “Design Considerations for an Artificially Intelligent Numerical Generalization System,” Syracuse, NY.
 1990 Speaker, Association of American Geographers (AAG) Annual Meeting, “Design Considerations for an Artificially Intelligent Numerical Generalization System,” Toronto, Canada.
 1983 Invited speaker, Association of Old Crows, “Automated Cartography,” New Hartford, NY.

Board service
Shea has served as a member of over a dozen industry, government, and academic advisory boards. Across his career, he has been the chairman of the board of nine companies, and either trustee or board member of five others, including:
 2017–present Chairman of the board, Peraton
 2020–2021 Chairman, Senior Advisory Group (SAG), Office of the Director of National Intelligence (ODNI) John Ratcliffe (DNI) and Neil Wiley (Principal Executive)
 2020–2020 Chairman, Senior Advisory Group (SAG), Office of the Director of National Intelligence (ODNI) Richard Grenell (Acting DNI)
 2019–2020 Chairman, Senior Advisory Group (SAG), Office of the Director of National Intelligence (ODNI) Joseph Maguire (Acting DNI) and Andrew P. Hallman (Principal Executive)
 2017–2019 Chairman, Senior Advisory Group (SAG), Office of the Director of National Intelligence (ODNI) Dan Coats (DNI) and Susan M. Gordon (PDDNI)
 2014–2017 Member, Senior Advisory Group (SAG), Office of the Director of National Intelligence (ODNI) Jim Clapper (DNI) and Stephanie O'Sullivan (PDDNI)
 2017–2021 Member, board of directors, Fornetix (Cyber)
 2016–2017 Member, board of directors, Applied Research Solutions (Cyber/Intel/Space)
 2016–2017 Member, board of advisors, Cohere Technology Group (Mission critical software)
 2015–present Member, board of trustees, Riverside Research (Cyber/ISR R&D)
 2013–2016 Member, advisory board, George Mason University, College of Science
 2013–present Member, advisory board, National Intelligence University Foundation (NIUF)
 2004–2014 Chairman of the board, United States Geospatial Intelligence Foundation (USGIF)
 2010–2014 Chairman of the board, Science, Engineering and Technology (SET) (DARPA/USAF)
 2010–2014 Chairman of the board, CloudShield Technologies, Inc. (Cybersecurity)
 2013–2014 Chairman of the board, Leidos Enterprise Properties, LLC (Real Estate)
 2013–2014 Chairman of the board, Leidos Realty, LLC (Real Estate)
 2012–2013 Chairman of the board, Campus Point Realty Corporation (Real Estate)
 2008–2010 Chairman of the board, Hicks and Associates, Inc. (Wargaming, Cultural Analytics)
 2006–2010 Chairman of the board, bd Systems, Inc. (USAF Space Control)
 2008–2009 Chairman of the board, SM Consulting (Linguistic Services)
 2013–2014 Member, board of trustees, Shakespeare Theatre Company (Theatre)
 2013–2015 Member, advisory board, Working Mother Media (Women in National Security)
 2005–2007 Member, advisory board, Geospatial21 / KidZ On-line (Geospatial Education for Kids)
 2012–2013 Member, advisory board, Intelligence and National Security Alliance (INSA)
 2013–2014 Chairman, ExecutiveBiz 4x24 Intelligence Group
 2003 Member, National Commission for the Review of the Research and Development Programs of the United States Intelligence Community
 1996 Member, National Academy of Sciences, National Research Council (United States), Commission on Engineering and Technical Systems, Marine Board
 2012–2015 Member, advisory board, University of Kansas, College of Liberal Arts & Sciences
 2003–2005 Member, advisory board, University of Virginia (UVA) Department of Systems and Information Engineering
 1990–2000 Member, editorial board, Urban and Regional Information Systems Association (URISA)
 1997–1999 Director (non-Federal), Cartography and Geographic Information Society (CaGIS)

References

1957 births
Living people
American chief operating officers
People from Mineola, New York
People from Ashburn, Virginia
Geographic data and information professionals